Littler is an English surname, derived from the place name Littleover, a village in Derbyshire. Some sources describe it as also originating from a hamlet called Little Over in Cheshire.

People with the surname 
 Diane S. Littler, American phycologist
Emile Littler (1903–1985), English theatrical impresario, producer and author
Gene Littler (1930–2019), American golfer
John Littler (cricketer) (18th century), English professional cricketer
John Hunter Littler (1783–1856), British army officer
Matt Littler (born 1982), English actor
Oswald Littler (1907–1970), English footballer
Prince Littler (1901–1973), British television executive
Stuart Littler (born 1979), English rugby league player
Susan Littler (1947–1982), English actress

See also
Littler Mendelson, an American law firm

References

English toponymic surnames